The Detainee Treatment Act of 2005 (DTA) is an Act of the United States Congress that was signed into law by President George W. Bush on 30 December 2005. Offered as an amendment to a supplemental defense spending bill, it contains provisions relating to treatment of persons in custody of the Department of Defense, and administration of detainees held in Guantanamo Bay, Cuba, including: 
Prohibiting "cruel, inhuman, or degrading treatment or punishment" of any prisoner of the U.S. government, including prisoners at Guantanamo Bay.
Requiring military interrogations to be performed according to the U.S. Army Field Manual for Human Intelligence Collector Operations.
Directing the Department of Defense to establish Combatant Status Review Tribunals (CSRTs) for persons held in Guantanamo Bay.
Giving the Washington, D.C. Circuit Court of Appeals authority to review decisions of CSRTs.
Requiring that habeas corpus appeals for aliens detained at Guantanamo be per the DTA, though offering no specific provisions for it. 
Giving immunity to government agents and military personnel from civil and criminal action for using interrogation techniques that "were officially authorized and determined to be lawful at the time they were conducted."

Legislative details

The amendment affected the United States Senate Department of Defense Appropriations Act, 2006 (DOD Act); the amendment is commonly referred to as the Amendment on (1) the Army Field Manual and (2) Cruel, Inhumane, Degrading Treatment, amendment #1977 and also known as the McCain Amendment 1977. It became the Detainee Treatment Act of 2005 (DTA) as Division A, Title X of the DOD Act. The amendment prohibits inhumane treatment of prisoners, including prisoners at Guantanamo Bay, by confining interrogations to the techniques in FM 34-52 Intelligence Interrogation. Also, section 1005(e) of the DTA prohibits aliens detained in Guantanamo Bay from applying for a writ of habeas corpus.

Amendment 1977 amended the  passed by the United States House of Representatives.  The amendment was introduced to the Senate by Senator John McCain (R-Arizona) on October 3, 2005, as S.Amdt.1977.

The amendment was co-sponsored by a bi-partisan group of senators, including Lindsey Graham,  Chuck Hagel, Gordon H. Smith, Susan M. Collins, Lamar Alexander, Richard Durbin, Carl Levin, John Warner, Lincoln Chafee, John E. Sununu, and Ken Salazar.

On October 5, 2005, the United States Senate voted 90–9 to support the amendment.

The Senators who voted against the amendment were Wayne Allard (R-CO), Christopher Bond (R-MO), Tom Coburn (R-OK), Thad Cochran (R-MS), John Cornyn (R-TX), James Inhofe (R-OK), Pat Roberts (R-KS), Jeff Sessions (R-AL), and Ted Stevens (R-AK).

Signing statement by President Bush
President Bush signed the bill into law on December 30, 2005. In his signing statement, Bush said:

The Boston Globe quoted an anonymous senior administration official saying,

Of course the president has the obligation to follow this law, (but) he also has the obligation to defend and protect the country as the commander in chief, and he will have to square those two responsibilities in each case. We are not expecting that those two responsibilities will come into conflict, but it's possible that they will.

Criticism 
The Act sets the Army's standards of interrogation as the standard for all agencies in the Department of Defense.  It prohibits all other agencies of the U.S. government, such as the CIA, from subjecting any person in their custody to "cruel, inhuman, or degrading treatment or punishment."  However, the Act does not provide detailed guidelines that spell out the meaning of that phrase. In an effort to provide clarification, Congress passed legislation in 2008 to similarly constrain the intelligence community to the Field Manual's techniques. McCain voted against this bill and recommended that President Bush follow through on his threat to veto it, arguing that the CIA already could not engage in torture but should have more options than afforded to military interrogators. That bill was passed by both chambers of Congress but, once vetoed, failed to pass with sufficient votes to override the executive veto.

The Detainee Treatment Act cited the U.S. Army's Field Manual on interrogation as the authoritative guide to interrogation techniques, but did not cite a specific edition of the Manual. The contents of the Manual are controlled by the Department of Defense, and thus the executive branch controls whether a given technique will be permitted or banned. The Manual has been revised since the Amendment became law. The Department of Defense has claimed that none of the techniques permitted by the new Field Manual 2-22.3 is classified.

Also, the Detainee Treatment Act's anti-torture provisions were modified by the Graham-Levin Amendment, which was attached to the $453-billion 2006 Defense Budget Bill. The Graham-Levin Amendment permits the Department of Defense to consider evidence obtained through torture of Guantanamo Bay detainees, and expands the prohibition of habeas corpus for re-detainees, which subsequently leaves detainees no legal recourse if they are tortured.

Critics say these two actions deflate the Detainee Treatment Act from having any real power in stopping torture by the United States government, and these were the reasons why President Bush and McCain "conceded" to congressional demands. The media credited their concession to "overwhelming congressional support" for the measure. Amnesty International claims that the amendment's loopholes signal that torture is now official US policy.

The Republican senators Lindsey Graham and Jon Kyl have been criticized for their amicus curiae brief filed in the Hamdan v. Rumsfeld (2006) case, in which they argued that the Detainee Treatment Act's passage sufficed to deny the Supreme Court jurisdiction over the case. Language in the Congressional Record, which is cited in the majority opinion, was inserted by Graham and Kyl into the Record for the day on which the amendment passed after the legislation had already been enacted. The language in question was worded in such a manner as to imply it had been recorded in live debate. The revised Record contains such phrasing as Kyl's "Mr. President, I see that we are nearing the end of our allotted time" and Sen. Sam Brownback's "If I might interrupt". Brownback has not responded to press inquiries. Justice Scalia's dissent noted this incident as an example on which he has based his longstanding hostility to the use of legislative history in court decisions.

Scalia wrote:

See also
United Nations Convention Against Torture
Ethical arguments regarding torture
Ticking time bomb scenario
Unlawful combatant
Military Commissions Act of 2006
Hamdan v. Rumsfeld
Guantanamo captives' appeals in Washington DC Courts
Military Commissions Act of 2009
Enemy Belligerent Interrogation, Detention, and Prosecution Act of 2010

References

External links
Bush, McCain and 'torture' - Robert J. Caldwell, The San Diego Union-Tribune - September 24, 2006
Text of Amendment 
Senators who voted for and against the amendment
McCain statement 
Editorial The McCain Amendment would hamstring U.S. interrogators. WSJ Opinion Journal (October 30, 2005)
McCain and the Not So Effectual Ban on Torture- Matthew R. McNabb, National Security Crimes Blog
Umansky, Eric Detention Tension Slate (November 2, 2005)
Detainee Treatment Act of 2005 (White House), JURIST, (December 31, 2005)
McCain Undermined: The 'Obedience to Orders' Defense, JURIST, (January 6, 2006)
No Habeas at Guantanamo? The Executive and the Dubious Tale of the DTA, JURIST, (March 6, 2006)
Why the McCain Torture Ban Won't Work: The Bush legacy of legalized torture by Professor Alfred W. McCoy, TomDispatch, February 8, 2006
Invisible Men: Did Lindsey Graham and Jon Kyl mislead the Supreme Court? by Emily Bazelon, Slate, March 27, 2006
The criticized amicus brief filed by Senators Graham and Kyl on Dec. 21, 2005
Smintheus, "Has McCain Flip-Flopped on Torture?" Daily Kos, April 11, 2008.
Human Rights First; Undue Process: An Examination of Detention and Trials of Bagram Detainees in Afghanistan in April 2009 (2009)
Human Rights First; Tortured Justice: Using Coerced Evidence to Prosecute Terrorist Suspects (2008)
Human Rights First; Leave No Marks: Enhanced Interrogation Techniques and the Risk of Criminality

United States federal defense and national security legislation
George W. Bush administration controversies
John McCain
Torture in the United States
Acts of the 109th United States Congress
Riders to United States federal appropriations legislation